Philip N. Hogen is an American attorney who was nominated by President Ronald Reagan to become the United States Attorney for the District of South Dakota. He served as U.S. Attorney from 1981 to 1991, the longest serving U.S. Attorney in South Dakota's history. He is an Oglala.

Early life and education
Hogen graduated from Augustana College in 1967 and the University of South Dakota School of Law in 1970.

Career
He was nominated by President Ronald Reagan in 1981, to be the United States Attorney. He returned to private practice and today maintains offices in the Black Hills, South Dakota and St. Paul, Minnesota in 1991. He specializes in American Indian law. He has served as the Commissioner of the National Indian Gaming Commission.

References

Year of birth missing (living people)
Living people
University of South Dakota School of Law alumni
21st-century American lawyers
South Dakota lawyers
South Dakota Republicans
Members of American gaming commissions
Native American United States Attorneys
Oglala people